Ignacio Achucarro Ayala (born 31 July 1936) is a former Paraguayan footballer. He played as a defender.

Career
Achucarro started his career in Olimpia Asunción of Paraguay, where he won two national championships before being transferred to Europe in 1958 to play for Sevilla FC. At Sevilla, he would spend 10 years before returning to Paraguay to play for Olimpia for the 1969 and 1970 seasons. Achucarro was part of the Paraguay national football team that qualified and played in the 1958 FIFA World Cup, where he played all three games for Paraguay.

Titles

References

1936 births
Living people
Sportspeople from Asunción
Paraguayan footballers
Association football defenders
Club Olimpia footballers
La Liga players
Sevilla FC players
Paraguay international footballers
1958 FIFA World Cup players
Paraguayan expatriate footballers
Expatriate footballers in Spain
Paraguayan expatriate sportspeople in Spain